Helen Slayton-Hughes ( Slayton; October 30, 1930 – December 7, 2022) was an American actress who was best known for playing Ethel Beavers in Parks and Recreation, as well as over 200 theatre and television shows.

Personal life 
Helen Slayton was born in 1930, the third of 4 children of Ralph Emil Slayton and Helen ( Peer) Slayton.

Slayton-Hughes was married and had four children and six grandchildren. However, no information exists regarding her husband, including his forename.

Slayton-Hughes died in her sleep on December 7, 2022, at age 92. Her death was publicly announced by her family on Thursday, December 8, 2022, via Facebook. Her funeral mass was celebrated on January 21, 2023 at St Thomas the Apostle Episcopal Church in Hollywood.

Filmography

Film

Television

Video games

References

External links

Official Site
Tv.com profile

1930 births
2022 deaths
20th-century American actresses
21st-century American actresses
Actresses from New Jersey
American film actresses
American television actresses
People from Glen Ridge, New Jersey
American Episcopalians